Staroikhsanovo (İśke İxsan) is a rural locality (a selo) in Chekmagushevsky District, Bashkortostan, Russia. The population was 216 as of 2010. There are 4 streets.

Geography 
Staroikhsanovo is located 31 km southeast of Chekmagush (the district's administrative centre) by road. Starobashirovo is the nearest rural locality.

References 

Rural localities in Chekmagushevsky District